Progress MS-02, identified by NASA as Progress 63P, was a Progress spaceflight operated by Roscosmos to resupply the International Space Station (ISS) in 2016. It was launched to deliver cargo to the ISS.

Technologies 

The Progress MS spacecraft has upgraded communications and electronics from previous Progress vehicles. After launch, ground controllers were able to communicate the Progress MS-02 via a Russian Luch data relay satellite in geosynchronous orbit. This was described as the first time a Progress or Soyuz spacecraft had such capability.

Other upgrades include:

 Upgraded Kurs-A rendezvous system designated Kurs-NA, including new antennas
 Upgraded flight control system that can take advantage of the GLONASS navigation satellites for the first time, for autonomous trajectory measurements
 New digital television system, which replaced an older analog TV, allowing transmission between the transport ship and the space station via onboard radio channels.
 New digital backup control unit
 Enhanced meteoroid shielding
 New LED-based lighting system
 Upgraded angular velocity sensors
 Docking port equipped with a backup electric driving mechanism

Launch 
Progress MS-02 was launched on 31 March 2016 at 16:23:57 UTC from the Baikonur Cosmodrome in Kazakhstan.

Docking 
Progress MS-02 docked successfully with the aft docking port of the Zvezda module on 2 April 2016 at 17:58 UTC.

Cargo 
The Progress MS-02 spacecraft carried 2425 kg of cargo and supplies to the International Space Station. The spacecraft delivered food, fuel and supplies, including 540 kg of propellant, 47 kg of oxygen and air, 420 kg of water, and 1418 kg of spare parts, supplies and experiment hardware for the six members of the Expedition 47 crew.

Also was delivered amateur satellite Tomsk-TPU 120 (1998-067MZ) built by the Tomsk Polytechnic University. The satellite is based on the 3U CubeSat standard and was constructed with using 3D printing technology. The satellite's size is 30 by 10 cm, weight is 5 kg. Release of Tomsk-TPU 120 was made by hand during a spacewalk on 17 August 2017. The satellite will broadcast congratulations on the 120th anniversary of the Tomsk Polytechnic University, recorded by students on 11 languages and will be operate on 437.025 MHz downlink.

References 

Progress (spacecraft) missions
Spacecraft launched in 2016
2016 in Russia
Spacecraft which reentered in 2016
Spacecraft launched by Soyuz-2 rockets
Supply vehicles for the International Space Station